The Castle of Palazuelos (Spanish: Castillo de Palazuelos) is a castle located in Palazuelos Sigüenza, Spain. It was declared Bien de Interés Cultural in 1951.

References 

Bien de Interés Cultural landmarks in the Province of Guadalajara
Castles in Castilla–La Mancha
Buildings and structures in Sigüenza